Microbiological Research is an academic journal in microbiology, published by Elsevier. It has an impact factor of 5.415 as of 2020. The journal was established in 1896.

The journal publishes research on prokaryotic and eukaryotic microorganisms such as yeasts, fungi, bacteria, archaea, and protozoa, as well as on interactions between pathogenic microorganisms and their environments or hosts. It focuses in particular on microbiology and genetics; molecular and cell biology; metabolism and physiology; signal transduction and development; biotechnology; phytopathology; and environmental microbiology ,and ecology.

The journal was originally published by Gustav Fischer Verlag. It was originally titled Centralblatt für Bakteriologie, Parasitenkunde und Infektionskrankheiten, then as the Zentralblatt für Bakteriologie, Parasitenkunde, Infektionskrankheiten und Hygiene until volume 136 (1981), and then as the Zentralblatt für Mikrobiologie from volumes 137 (1982) to 148 (1993). It was renamed Microbiological Research in 1993. Formerly published in German, it is now an English-language journal.

External links
http://www.journals.elsevier.com/microbiological-research/

Microbiology journals
Elsevier academic journals
Delayed open access journals